Ewan is an unincorporated community located within Harrison Township, in Gloucester County, New Jersey, United States. The area is served by the United States Postal Service as ZIP code 08025.

Constructed in 1793, the Iredell House No. 2, located on Ewan Road, was constructed by Thomas Iredell for his second wife. The peak of the front of the house shows the letter "I", underneath that the letters "T.A.R." and below that the number 1793; the three letters are thought to be the initials of Iredell's three children.

References

Harrison Township, New Jersey
Unincorporated communities in Gloucester County, New Jersey
Unincorporated communities in New Jersey